Zeb Little (born August 24, 1968) is a former Democratic member of the Alabama Senate, representing the 4th district from 1998 to 2010. He was the Majority Leader and Floor Leader of the Alabama Senate from 2002 to 2010.

Biography 
Little was born in Cullman, Alabama, and attended Cullman High School. He received his bachelor's degree from the University of Alabama at Birmingham and his Juris Doctor degree from the Cumberland School of Law of Samford University. He is a member of the Alabama State Bar, the Cullman County Bar Association, and other bar associations.

Little served three terms as Alabama State Senator from district 4. During his first and second terms, he served as Chairperson of the Agriculture, Conservation, and Forestry Committee and Vice Chairperson of the Judiciary Committee. Halfway through his second term, he was elected as Senate Majority Leader to fill a vacancy.

He was again elected by his fellow Senators as Senate Majority Leader for the term 2007–2010. Senator Little was the youngest senator ever elected to serve as the Alabama Senate Majority Leader and also the youngest senator to ever chair an Alabama Senate standing committee.
	
In 2019 he was convicted of theft.

Notes

External links
Project Vote Smart - Senator Zebulon Peyton 'Zeb' Little Sr. (AL) profile
Follow the Money - Zeb Little
2006 2002 1998 campaign contributions

Democratic Party Alabama state senators
1968 births
Living people
Cumberland School of Law alumni
People from Cullman, Alabama
Alabama politicians convicted of crimes